Donagh MacDonagh (22 November 1912 – 1 January 1968) was an Irish writer, judge, presenter, broadcaster, and playwright.

Personal life

MacDonagh was born in Dublin on St Cecilia's Day in 1912. He was still a young child when his father Thomas MacDonagh, an Irish nationalist and poet, was executed in 1916. Tragedy struck again when his mother, Muriel Gifford, died of a heart attack a year afterwards while swimming at Skerries to Lambay, County Dublin on 9 July 1917. The two children were then taken care of by their maternal aunts, in particular Catherine Wilson.

His parents' families then engaged in a series of custody lawsuits, as the MacDonaghs were Roman Catholic and the Giffords were Protestant; in the climate of Ne Temere, the MacDonaghs were successful.

He and his sister Barbara (who later married actor Liam Redmond) lived briefly with their paternal aunt Eleanor Bingham, County Clare before being put into the custody of strangers until their late teens, when they were taken in by Jack MacDonagh. He wrote a radio play, The Happy Day about his time with Eleanor Bingham
.

He was married twice, to Maura Smyth and, following her death after she drowned in a bath whilst having an epileptic seizure, to her sister, Nuala Smyth.  He had four children, Iseult and Breifne by Maura, and Niall and Barbara by Nuala.

He died on 1 January 1968 and is buried at Deans Grange Cemetery.

Legal career
MacDonagh was educated at Belvedere College and University College Dublin (UCD) with contemporaries Cyril Cusack, Denis Devlin, Charlie Donnelly, Brian O'Nolan, Niall Sheridan and Mervyn Wall. 

In 1935 he was called to the Bar and practised on the Western Circuit. 

In 1941 he was appointed a temporary  District Justice in County Mayo. Per his son, Niall, he always doubted the validity of his appointment as the constitution made no allowance for a temporary justice. However, the constitution required ten years standing as a barrister or solicitor to be appointed and he had only seven. After reaching ten years he was appointed district justice in Wexford. To date, he remains the youngest person appointed as a judge in Ireland. He was Justice for the Dublin Metropolitan Courts at the time of his death.

Writing
In 1934 he and Niall Sheridan self published Twenty Poems with each contributing ten poems. He published three volumes of poetry: "Veterans and Other Poems" (1941), The Hungry Grass (1947) and A Warning to Conquerors (1968). He also edited the Oxford Book of Irish Verse (1958) with Lennox Robinson.

He also wrote poetic dramas and ballad operas. One play, Happy As Larry, was translated into a number of languages. He had three other plays produced: God's Gentry (1951, a ballad opera about the tinkers), Lady Spider (1959, about Deirdre of the Sorrows and the Three sons of Ussna) and Step in the Hollow a piece of situation comedy nonsense.

He also wrote short stories; staged the first Irish production of ‘’Murder in the Cathedral’’ with Liam Redmond, later his brother-in-law; and was a popular broadcaster on Radio Éireann.

Literature

Poetry collections 
 1934 - with Niall Seridan. Twenty Poems. Self published.
1941 - Veterans and Other Poems, Cuala Press, Dublin 1941
 1947 - The Hungry Grass, Faber & Faber, London 1947
 1954 - The Ballad of Jane Shore, Dolmen Press, Dublin 1954
 1958 - The Oxford Book of Irish Verse: XVIIth Century - XXth Century, Clarendon Press, Oxford 1958 (editor with Lennox Robinson)
 1969 - A Warning to Conquerors, Dolmen Press, Dublin 1969 (preface by Niall Sheridan)

Plays 
 1946 - Happy As Larry, Maurice Fridberg, London 1946 A ballad opera. The most successful play in London in post-war years though produced unsuccessfully in New York in an elaborate production by Burgess Meredith. Has been translated into a number of languages
 1951 - God's Gentry  A ballad opera. Frequently acted but unpublished play about travellers (Belfast Arts Theatre, August 1951)
 1957 - Step in the Hollow, Penguin 1959  (A piece of situation comedy nonsense (Gaiety Theatre, 11 Mar. 1957))
 1967 - Reprint of Happy as Larry by the Dolmen Press including a scene written after the initial publication.
 1980 - Lady Spider, edited and annotated by Gordon M. Wickstrom, in Journal of Irish Literature, 9 (Sept. 1980), pp. 3–82
 (unpublished) - Lady Spider. About Deirdre of the Sorrows and the three sons of Uisnech

 Secondary literature 
 Robert Hogan -  After the Irish Renaissance -,  1986
 Desmond Ernest Stewart Maxwell – Modern Irish Drama 1891-1980''  -, Cambridge 1985
.

External links 
 Website of Donagh MacDonagh's Son, including links to poems and plays

References 

1912 births
1968 deaths
Burials at Deans Grange Cemetery
People from County Dublin
20th-century Irish poets
People educated at Belvedere College
Donagh